Lake Hule, which translates to Lake of Rubber, due to the abundance of rubber trees nearby, it is a fresh water crater lake located in the northern highlands of Costa Rica. It is part of a complex of lakes comprising Lake Hule, Lake Congo and Lake Bosque Alegre. The lakes are part of the Bosque Alegre Wildlife Refuge.

Location 

It is located in Los Ángeles Sur, of Río Cuarto canton, of Alajuela province.

Physical aspects 

Lake Hule is a maar lake located within a crater, it has an almost circular outline. There is no secondary volcanic activity present. 

It is filled by three small streams that drains the north slope of Congo Volcano

See also 
 List of lakes in Costa Rica

References 

Geography of Alajuela Province
Tourist attractions in Alajuela Province
Hule